Walter Hirsh  (born 24 March 1936), known as Wally Hirsh, is a New Zealand educator and former Race Relations Conciliator.

Hirsh was born in Mönchengladbach, Germany on 24 March 1936, and his family fled Nazi persecution in 1938 to find a new life in Milton, New Zealand. He attended Tokomairiro District High School, Macandrew Intermediate School and Otago Boys' High School in Dunedin.

Hirsch studied at Wellington Teachers' College and obtained a Trained Teacher's Certificate in 1958. He then studied at Victoria University, completing two degrees before embarking on a career in education and race relations. From 1959 to 1965, he worked as a teacher in the Wellington Region. From 1965 to 1969, he was a country teacher and school principal. In 1970, he lectured at Wellington Teachers' College. He was principal at Mount Cook School (1971–1974) and Karori West Normal School (1975–1985). He was inspector of schools in 1980.

Hirsh was awarded a Fulbright Scholarship in 1975, and travelled among Navajo and Mohawk communities in the United States and Canada.

In 1985, Hirsh was appointed New Zealand's Race Relations Conciliator and a Human Rights Commissioner, a position he held for five years. Other positions he has held have included a consultancy with New Zealand's Ethnic Affairs Department, Department head at Auckland University of Technology, principal of Auckland's main Jewish education centre, Kadimah College. Hirsh has also authored several books, among them the autobiography, "Out of The Shadows: My life's journey from Monchengladbach to Milton and beyond" (2013). He was the foundation chairman of the New Zealand Jewish Council from 1980 to 1985. 

Hirsh was awarded an OBE in the 1990 New Year Honours for services to race relations, and was appointed a Justice of the Peace in 1993. 

In 1958, Hirsh married Adele de Woolf; they had two sons and one daughter.

References

1936 births
Living people
New Zealand educators
New Zealand public servants
People from Mönchengladbach
People from Milton, New Zealand
New Zealand Jews